Phenylenediamine may refer to:

o-phenylenediamine or OPD, a chemical compound C6H4(NH2)2
m-phenylenediamine or MPD, a chemical compound C6H4(NH2)2
p-phenylenediamine or PPD, a chemical compound C6H4(NH2)2
N,N-dimethyl-p-phenylenediamine or DMPD
N,N,N′,N′-tetramethyl-p-phenylenediamine or TMPD, used in microbiology
N,N-diethyl-p-phenylenediamine or DPD

Diamines